Maeda Toshitaka may refer to:

Maeda Toshitaka (Nanokaichi) (1616–1637), daimyō of Nanokaichi Domain
Maeda Toshitaka (Toyama) (1690-1745), daimyō of Toyama Domain

See also
Maeda clan